The Up-Country People's Front is a political party in Sri Lanka. It is part of the Tamil Progressive Alliance.

History
The party was established in 1989.

At the last legislative elections, held on 2 April 2004, the party won 0.5% of the popular vote and 2 out of 225 seats. One is an elected seat and the second member of parliament was appointed through the national list of the United National Party.

The Leader of the party was P. Chandrasekaran, who was also The Minister of Community Development and Social Inequity Eradication in the current government. Chandrasekaran died on 1 January 2010, from a heart attack.

The second representative is P. Radhakrishnan, who is also the Minister of Vocational and Technical Training.

References

 
1989 establishments in Sri Lanka
Political parties established in 1989
Indian Tamil politicians of Sri Lanka